The Six Provinces of Southern Vietnam (Vietnamese: Nam Kỳ Lục tỉnh, 南圻六省 or just Lục tỉnh, 六省) is a historical name for the region of Southern Vietnam, which is referred to in French as Basse-Cochinchine (Lower Cochinchina). The region was politically defined and established after the inauguration of the Nguyễn dynasty, and called by this name from 1832, when Emperor Minh Mạng introduced administrative reforms, to 1867, which culminated in the eight-year French campaign to conquer the Six Provinces.

The six provinces, which in 1832 Emperor Minh Mạng divided Southern Vietnam into, are: 
 Phiên An, later changed name to Gia Định (provincial capital city: Sài Gòn),
 Biên Hòa (provincial capital: Biên Hòa),
 Định Tường (provincial capital: Mỹ Tho) 
 Vĩnh Long (provincial capital: Vĩnh Long),
 An Giang (provincial capital: Châu Đốc),
 Hà Tiên (provincial capital: Hà Tiên).
These provinces are often subdivided into two groups: the three eastern provinces of Gia Định, Định Tường, and Biên Hòa; and the three western provinces of Vĩnh Long, An Giang, and Hà Tiên.

History 

The Mekong Delta region (the location of the Six Provinces) was gradually annexed by Vietnam from the Khmer Empire starting in the mid 17th century to the early 19th century, through their Nam tiến territorial expansion campaign. In 1832, Emperor Minh Mạng divided Southern Vietnam into the six provinces Nam Kỳ Lục tỉnh.

According to the Đại Nam nhất thống chí (Nguyễn dynasty national atlas) of the Quốc sử quán (official Nguyễn-era compilation of Vietnamese history, geography and people from 1821 to 1945), in 1698 the lord Nguyễn Phúc Chu established the prefecture (phủ) of Gia Định. In 1802, emperor Gia Long turned Gia Định prefecture into a township, and in 1808, he renamed Gia Định prefecture into a governorate containing the five townships of Phiên An, Biên Hòa (or Đồng Nai), Định Tường, Vĩnh Thanh (or Vĩnh Long), and Hà Tiên. In 1832, emperor Minh Mạng renamed Phiên An Citadel into Gia Định Citadel, and the 5 townships were turned into the six provinces of Phiên An, Biên Hòa, Định Tường, Vĩnh Long, Hà Tiên, and the newly established An Giang. Thus, the Six Provinces was created in 1832; and in 1834 the Six Provinces were collectively called Nam Kỳ ("Southern Region", which would eventually be known in the West as Cochinchina). Phiên An province was renamed to Gia Định province in 1835.

After the French colonial invaders, led by vice-admiral Charles Rigault de Genouilly attacked and captured the three eastern provinces of Gia Định, Định Tường, and Biên Hòa in 1862, and invaded the remaining western provinces of Vĩnh Long, An Giang, Hà Tiên in 1867, the French Empire abolished the administrative divisions created by the Nguyễn dynasty. At first, the French used départements instead of prefectures, and arrondissements in place of districts (huyện). By 1868, the former Nam Kỳ Lục tỉnh had over 20 arrondissements (districts). Cochinchina was ruled by a French government-appointed governor in Saigon, and each county had a Secrétaire d’Arrondissement (en: "County Secretary", vi: "thư ký địa hạt" or "bang biện"). Bạc Liêu county was created in 1882. On 16 January 1899, the counties were changed into provinces per a French government decree, each with a provincial premier (fr: "chef de la province", vi: "chủ tỉnh") who is head of provincial government.

French division into 21 smaller provinces, discontinuation of the Six Provinces  
The French government divided the original six provinces into 21 smaller ones. Following the 1899 decrees, starting 01/01/1900 Nam Kỳ would be divided into the following 21 provinces:
Gia Định province was divided into the 5 provinces of: Gia Định, Chợ Lớn, Tân An, Tây Ninh, and Gò Công.
Biên Hòa province was divided into the 4 provinces of: Biên Hòa, Bà Rịa, Thủ Dầu Một, and Cap Saint-Jacques (later Vũng Tàu province). Cap Saint Jacques was created on 30/04/1929 and dissolved 01/01/1935; in 1947 the province was re-established under the name Vũng Tàu until 1952 when it was dissolved again.
Định Tường province became Mỹ Tho province.
Vĩnh Long province was divided into the 3 provinces of: Vĩnh Long, Bến Tre, and Trà Vinh.
An Giang province was divided into the 5 provinces of: Châu Đốc, Long Xuyên, Sa Đéc, Sóc Trăng, and Cần Thơ.
Hà Tiên province was divided into the 3 provinces of: Hà Tiên, Rạch Giá, Bạc Liêu.
On 11/05/1944 Tân Bình province was created, carved out of Gia Định province.

The reason for this division into 21 provinces was because the French Empire intended to erase the name "Lục tỉnh" from the hearts and minds of the Vietnamese people and language, and cut any feelings of attachment and Vietnamese nationalism with this region to avert potential local revolution or rebellion. However, in 1908 the newspaper Lục Tỉnh Tân Văn ("Six Provinces News") whose editor was Gilbert Trần Chánh Chiếu, still commonly used the names "Lục Tỉnh" and "Lục Châu". The French Empire called Southern Vietnam (Nam Kỳ) Cochinchine, Northern Vietnam (Bắc Kỳ) Tonkin and Central Vietnam (Trung Kỳ) Annam. "Cochinchina" was the name used by English speakers at the time.

Administrative divisions 

Sources for entire table:

See also 
 Cochinchina
 French Indochina
 Provinces of Vietnam
 Đại Nam nhất thống chí
 Gilbert Trần Chánh Chiếu
 Siamese–Vietnamese War (1841–1845)
 Post-Angkor Period

References

Further reading
Choi Byung Wook (2004). Southern Vietnam under the Reign of Minh Mang (1820–1841): Central Policies and Local Response. Ithaca, NY: Cornell University Press.

External links 
 Official website on the Six Provinces, used by archaeologists, historians and researchers.
 Notes on the Six Provinces written by Professor Lâm Văn Bé.
 Extensive Geographical and Brief Historical Information on the Six Provinces, from the French National Library (French)
 Map of South Vietnam (Republic of Vietnam) and its provinces
 Map of Vietnam and its provinces

 

Provinces of Vietnam
History of Vietnam
Geography of Vietnam
Regions of Southeast Asia